Matt Duffield is an American politician. He serves as a Republican member for the 53rd district of the Arkansas House of Representatives.

Life and career 
Duffield attended Russellville High School and Harding University.

In 2022, Duffield defeated Doug Skelton and David J. Howell in the Republican primary election for the 53rd district of the Arkansas House of Representatives. No candidate was nominated to challenge him in the general election. He assumed office in 2023.

References 

Living people
Place of birth missing (living people)
Year of birth missing (living people)
Republican Party members of the Arkansas House of Representatives
21st-century American politicians
Harding University alumni